Cycas dolichophylla is a species of cycad in northern Vietnam and southern China.

Range
Subpopulations include:
West of Moc Chau (morphologically intermediate between Cycas dolichophylla and Cycas collina)
Vo Nhai District and Yen Son District, Thai Nguyen Province (morphologically intermediate between Cycas dolichophylla and Cycas ferruginea)
Villages west of Thai Nguyen (morphologically intermediate between Cycas dolichophylla and Cycas multifrondis)
Gulinqing Township (古林箐乡), Maguan County and Malipo County, Yunnan, China

References

dolichophylla